The Perfectionists may refer to:
 The Perfectionists (book), a 2014 novel written by Sara Shepard
 The Perfectionists (book series), a book series of young-adult novels written by Sara Shepard
 Pretty Little Liars: The Perfectionists, an American television series based on the books and spin-off of Pretty Little Liars